The Gazette of Pakistan is the official government gazette of the Government of Pakistan. This Gazette provides information about government acts, ordinances, regulations, orders, S.R.Os, notifications, appointments, promotions, leaves, and awards.

See also 
 List of government gazettes

References

External links
 The Gazette of Pakistan

Law of Pakistan
Pakistan federal departments and agencies
Mass media in Pakistan
Newspapers published in Pakistan
Pakistan
Publications with year of establishment missing